Caladenia paradoxa, commonly known as the ironcaps spider orchid, is a species of orchid endemic to the south-west of Western Australia. It has a single erect, hairy leaf and up to three small creamy-white flowers. It was previously thought to be the same species as the eastern Australian Caladenia flaccida but is now recognised as distinct.

Description 
The sepals and petals have long, thin, drooping, brown thread-like ends. The sides of the labellum have short, blunt teeth and there are two rows of anvil-shaped, cream-coloured calli which sometimes have red tips along its mid-line. Flowering occurs from August to early October.

Taxonomy and naming 
Caladenia paradoxa was first described in 2001 by Stephen Hopper and Andrew Phillip Brown from a specimen collected near Southern Cross and the description was published in Nuytsia. The specific epithet (paradoxa) is a Latin word meaning "strange" or "contrary to expectations" referring to the difficulty of categorising this as a separate species.

Distribution and habitat 
The ironcaps spider orchid is found on the coastal plain between Wubin and Norseman in the Avon Wheatbelt, Coolgardie, Jarrah Forest and Mallee biogeographic regions. It usually grows on the slopes of ironstone hills.

Conservation
Caladenia paradoxa is classified as "not threatened" by the Western Australian Government Department of Parks and Wildlife.

References 

paradoxa
Endemic orchids of Australia
Orchids of Western Australia
Plants described in 2001
Endemic flora of Western Australia
Taxa named by Stephen Hopper
Taxa named by Andrew Phillip Brown